Postbridge is a hamlet in the heart of Dartmoor in the English county of Devon. It lies on the B3212, roughly midway between Princetown and Moretonhampstead.

Postbridge is next to the East Dart river, one of two main tributaries of the River Dart, and consists of a few houses, a shop, a pub and hotel, and a national park tourist information centre.

Postbridge is best known for its fine example of an ancient clapper bridge over the river. First recorded in the 14th century, the bridge is believed to have been built in the 13th century to enable pack horses to cross the river, carrying tin to the stannary town of Tavistock. The clapper bridge, a Grade II*-listed structure, is still complete, and stands alongside another bridge, a Grade II-listed structure built in the 1780s.

The settlement is also infamous for the ghost story of the Hairy Hands, which takes place near the village.

References

Dartmoor
Hamlets in Devon
Bridges in Devon
River Dart
Stone bridges in the United Kingdom